"December"  is a song by Swedish singer Måns Zelmerlöw. The song was released as a digital download on 22 November 2010 through Warner Music Group as the lead single from his third studio album Christmas with Friends (2010). The song is also included on the album Kära vinter (2011). The song did not enter the Swedish Singles Chart, but peaked to number 9 on the Sweden Heatseeker Songs.

Track listing

Chart performance

Weekly charts

Release history

References

2010 songs
2010 singles
Måns Zelmerlöw songs
English-language Swedish songs
Warner Music Group singles